Petín is a municipality in the Spanish province of Ourense. It has a population of 1131 (Spanish 2001 Census) and an area of 31 km2.

References  

Municipalities in the Province of Ourense